Samuel Clowes Huneke is an American historian of modern Europe and author. He works at George Mason University.

His parents are Slavicist Edith Clowes and mathematician Craig Huneke.

Works

References

Living people
George Mason University faculty
Year of birth missing (living people)